Xenophilus arseniciresistens is a Gram-negative, aerobic, arsenite-resistant and motile bacterium from the genus Xenophilus which has been isolated from soil.

References

Comamonadaceae
Bacteria described in 2014